Edward Spencer may refer to:

 Edward Spencer (athlete) (1881–1965), British race walker
 John Spencer, 8th Earl Spencer (Edward John Spencer, 1924–1992), British peer, father of Diana, Princess of Wales
 Edward Spencer (English politician) (1594–1656), English politician who sat in the House of Commons at various times between 1621 and 1648
 Edward Spencer (Canadian politician) (1893–1973), civil engineer and politician in Newfoundland
 Edward Spencer (rugby union) (1876–1931), Scottish rugby player
 Tubby Spencer (Edward Russell Spencer, 1884–1945), American baseball player

See also
Ted Spencer, lacrosse coach